The 2013–14 UCI Africa Tour was the tenth season of the UCI Africa Tour. The season began on 16 October 2013 with the Grand Prix Chantal Biya and ended on 23 November 2014 with the Tour of Rwanda.

The points leader, based on the cumulative results of previous races, wore the UCI Africa Tour cycling jersey. Adil Jelloul of Morocco was the defending champion of the 2012–13 UCI Africa Tour.

Throughout the season, points were awarded to the top finishers of stages within stage races and the final general classification standings of each of the stages races and one-day events. The quality and complexity of a race also determines how many points are awarded to the top finishers, the higher the UCI rating of a race, the more points are awarded.

The UCI ratings from highest to lowest are as follows:
 Multi-day events: 2.HC, 2.1 and 2.2
 One-day events: 1.HC, 1.1 and 1.2
The 2013−14 competition was won by Mekseb Debesay of Eritrea, who rode for the Bike Aid cycling team.

Events

2013

2014

References

External links
 

UCI Africa Tour
2013–14 UCI Africa Tour
2013–14 UCI Africa Tour
UCI Africa Tour
UCI Africa Tour